Rhopophilus is a genus of songbirds in the family Paradoxornithidae.

The genus contains two species:
 Beijing babbler, Rhopophilus pekinensis
 Tarim babbler, Rhopophilus albosuperciliaris

References

 
Bird genera
Paradoxornithidae
Taxonomy articles created by Polbot